Claude Bachand is also the name of a member of the National Assembly of Quebec.

Claude Bachand (born January 3, 1951 in Saint-Jean-sur-Richelieu, Quebec) is a Quebec politician who represented the riding of Saint-Jean in the House of Commons of Canada from 1993 until 2011 as a member of the Bloc Québécois. Bachand was the National Defence critic for the Bloc Québécois. Before entering politics, Bachand was an educator.

Bachand ran for mayor of Saint-Jean-sur-Richelieu in the 2013 and 2017 municipal elections, losing both times.

References

External links
 How'd They Vote?: Claude Bachand's voting history and quotes

1951 births
Bloc Québécois MPs
French Quebecers
Living people
Members of the House of Commons of Canada from Quebec
People from Saint-Jean-sur-Richelieu
21st-century Canadian legislators
20th-century Canadian legislators